This is a discography of composer trio, record producer and multi-instrumentalists Shankar–Ehsaan–Loy.

Film discography

Original soundtracks

Adapted soundtracks

As guest composers

Shelved projects
This section contains soundtracks for films that have been shelved or whose release dates are unknown.

Albums

As Instant Karma:
 Dance Masti (1997) (Remix album)
 The Return of Dance Masti (1999) (Remix album)
 Dance Masti... Again (2006) (Remix album)
 Dance Masti Forever (2009) (Remix album)
 The Best of Dance Masti 3-CD Set
 The Dance Masti Collection 4-CD Set

TV series

Singles

Soundtrack singles

Compilations
 The Best of Shankar Ehsaan Loy (2-CD Set) ( 2010) – Sony Music Entertainment

Music videos

Featured singles

Theatre
Zangoora (2010)

Concerts
 Shankar-Ehsaan-Loy Inspiration: Aman Ki Aasha tour

Ad jingles

As Ehsaan and Loy 
 Pepsi
 Coca-Cola
 Kingfisher
 Slice
 Eveready Red
 Vaseline
 Future Group
 Cadbury's Perk
 Fevicol
 Close Up
 Fair & Lovely

As Shankar, Ehsaan and Loy
 Pepsi – Oye Bubbly
 Coca-Cola – Sab Ka Thanda Ek
 Brooke Bond
 Digjam
 ICICI
 Visa – Inspire India
 IRB
 Lux – Sone Se Bhi Sona Lage
 Snap Deal – Unbox Zindagi

Signature tunes
Corporate
 Reliance (Anil Dhirubhai Ambani Group): Composed the Corporate Identity for Reliance.
 Aircel: Signature Tune
 Tata Steel:  Official Corporate Anthem
 Apollo Hospitals: Official anthem
Sports Anthems
 De Ghuma Ke: 2011 Cricket World Cup official anthem
  Rockvi Jayagamu (Yamu Yamu): Carlton Super Sevens Rugby League Theme Song
 2010 Commonwealth Games: Scored the commonwealth song "Dilli Chalo!". (Not to be confused with the official anthem "Jiyo Utho Bado Jeeto" composed by A. R. Rahman)
 Ek Desh Ek Junoon:  SET Max's campaign for the 2009 Indian Premier League
 Sahara Pune Warriors:  Official Anthem
Public Awareness Campaigns
 Sarva Shiksha Abhiyan: The song for the ad campaign "School Chalein Hum".
 The Greenathon Anthem: The song Hawaein feat. Preeti Zinta.
 India Poised: The signature tune for Times of India campaign. Lyrics penned by Gulzar.
 India Rising anthem for CNN-IBN The India Rising campaign. Sung by Asha Bhosle

Singers debuted with Shankar–Ehsaan–Loy

Below are the list of singers who made their singing debuts for Shankar-Ehsaan-Loy.*

{| style="width:100%;"
|- valign="top"
|

*List includes professional singers only. Actors like Farhan Akhtar, Abhay deol not included.

References

Discography
Shankar Ehsaan Loy